Len Pennie is a Scottish poet and Scots language and mental health advocate. She became known on social media in 2020 during the COVID-19 pandemic in Scotland for her "Scots word of the day" and poem (poyum) videos. Her Twitter and Tiktok accounts currently (March 2022) have over 400,000 followers worldwide.

Career

Poetry
Pennie competed in Robert Burns poetry recital competitions while she was at school.

When she was furloughed from her work in a restaurant during the first COVID-19 lockdown in Scotland, she began posting a video about a Scots word each day on Twitter to show the pronunciation and meaning of the word and how to use it in context.

Her poems include I'm no havin children, contrasting the English "children" with the Scots "weans", which went viral in October 2020. Following the popularity of her posts, she received online abuse, including misogyny and attacks on the status of Scots as a language, and criticism, including from George Galloway, for what critics perceived as a "faux identity" or supporting Scottish nationalism. However, Pennie also received support from well-known figures including actor Michael Sheen, comedian and campaigner Janey Godley, author Neil Gaiman, writer Billy Kay, food writer Nigella Lawson, TV presenter Greg Jenner, and playwright David Greig. Godley said "People keep sending me videos of a young lassie (Miss Punny Pennie) who is explaining what Scots words mean. Beautiful poetry is coming out of her mouth and her language is just spectacular."

Pennie was one of five poets commissioned to write a poem for a Christmas campaign by Lidl about the Daft Days. Her recitation of Robert Burns' Rantin’ Rovin’ Robin was shared by the Scottish Poetry Library and she performed to over 1,200 people for the University of St Andrews' online Global Burns Night and at the National Trust for Scotland's Big Burns Night in January 2021. In February 2021, she was commissioned by the campaign group Witches of Scotland to write and perform a poem for their film In Memorial, to honour those, mainly women, who were persecuted under the Witchcraft Acts. In November 2020, she was commissioned by the Saint Andrew's Society of Los Angeles to write a Scottish diaspora poem which resulted in "Scots Nothin Tae Dae Wae That" and in March 2021 she was named Poet Laureate of the Saint Andrew's Society of Los Angeles

Other writing
Pennie was a judge for a BBC Radio Scotland young writers competition on climate change. She has written for TES on the importance of Scots in the classroom.

In September 2022 she became a columnist for The Herald.

Personal life and education
Pennie earned her undergraduate degree in Spanish Language and Literature at the University of St Andrews. She has worked as a chef. In addition to Scots and English, she speaks Spanish and French. She grew up in Airdrie in a household speaking Scots with her parents, grandparents, and siblings. Her mother and father are teachers. Pennie credits her grandparents and mother for teaching her Scots, and inspiring her love of languages.

References

External links 
 Miss PunnyPennie on Twitter
 

Living people
21st-century Scottish poets
People from Lanarkshire
Scots-language poets
People associated with the University of St Andrews
Scottish women poets
1999 births
Mental health activists
Scottish poets